Octavian Oliver Lanoire (born 22 January 1996), known mononymously as Octavian, is a French-British rapper, singer, and songwriter from London. In 2019 he won the BBC's Sound of Award, their top award for new artists. He has appeared on tracks produced by Diplo, Mura Masa, Take a Daytrip, JRick and A2. He has collaborated with Skepta, A$AP Ferg, Gorillaz, and many others.

Early life
Octavian was born in Lille, France, to an Angolan and Ivorian family. After his father died, he moved to the UK with his mother at the age of three, settling in Camberwell, South London. As a teenager, he won a scholarship to the BRIT School, but dropped out after a year and a half.

Music career
Octavian's first mixtape, 22, was released in 2016 under the name "Octavian OG", followed by the Essie World EP in 2017. His recognition increased in January 2018 after a video of Drake singing along to the track "Party Here" at a Golden Globes afterparty was posted on Instagram. The track was produced in collaboration with producer J Rick.

The Fader have described Octavian's sound as a mixture of house, rap, and drill, as well as noting that his sound was influenced by Drake and Bon Iver. Pitchfork have described the sound as mixing "R&B and dancehall with downbeat grime, peppy house, and UK hip-hop". Critics have disagreed about how to classify Octavian's style, with High Snobiety noting that he is "Too British to be labeled trap but too American to be classed as grime".

The Guardian described his 2018 mixtape Spaceman as "a spectacular medley of the past decade of UK subgenres – the raspy-voiced rapper amalgamates elements of drill, grime and house to create something dextrous and distinctive." Pitchfork described the release as "daring eclecticism".

In August 2018, Octavian signed with Sony / ATV Records. 
In January 2019, Octavian won the BBC Sound of 2019 award, their top award for new artists.

In June 2020, a single featuring Octavian from Gorillaz's seventh studio album, Song Machine, Season One: Strange Timez, titled "Friday 13th", was released.

Abuse allegation
In November 2020, Octavian's ex-partner alleged that she had suffered years of emotional and physical abuse from him during their relationship. He denied the allegations. She posted videos and text messages claiming to show the alleged abuse, and claimed that he attacked her with a hammer and threatened to kill her. She also said she was asked by his management to sign an NDA for £20,000 and called out their complicity. Octavian's management later stated that their business relationship ended, as did his PR agency. His label, Black Butter Records, went on to make a statement that they had dropped him and would not be releasing his album.

Discography

Studio albums

Mixtapes

Extended plays

Singles

As featured artist

References

1996 births
Living people
Musicians from Lille
People from Camberwell
Black British male rappers
British trap musicians
Rappers from London
English people of Angolan descent
French emigrants to the United Kingdom